The Para ice hockey competition of the 2018 Winter Paralympics was held at Gangneung Hockey Centre, South Korea, from 10 to 18 March 2018. A total of eight teams competed in the mixed team tournament. Lena Schrøder from Norway has become the second female Para ice hockey player at the Paralympic Games after Britt Mjaasund Øyen.

Medalists

Qualification

Match officials
5 referees and 8 linesmen were selected for the tournament.

Referees
 Kristijan Nikolic
 Kevin Webinger
 Sotaro Yamaguchi
 Owe Lüthcke
 Johnathan Morrison

Linesmen
 David Nothegger
 Matt Clark
 Matthew Fergenbaum
 Jan Vaněk
 Leon Wesley
 Chae Young-jin
 Han Youl
 Andreas Lundén

Preliminary round
All times are local (UTC+9).

Group A

Group B

Classification round

Bracket

5–8th place semifinals

Seventh place game

Fifth place game

Medal round

Bracket

Semifinals

Bronze medal game

Gold medal game

Final ranking

Statistics

Scoring leaders
List shows the top ten skaters sorted by points, then goals.

GP = Games played; G = Goals; A = Assists; Pts = Points; +/− = Plus/minus; PIM = Penalties in minutes; POS = PositionSource: PyeongChang 2018

Leading goaltenders
Only the top five goaltenders, based on save percentage, who have played at least 40% of their team's minutes, are included in this list.
TOI = Time on ice (minutes:seconds); GA = Goals against; GAA = Goals against average; SA = Shots against; Sv% = Save percentage; SO = ShutoutsSource: PyeongChang 2018

Awards
Best players selected by the directorate:
Best Goaltender:  Lee Jae-woong
Best Defenceman:  Adam Dixon
Best Forward:  Brody Roybal
Source: PyeongChang 2018

References

External links
Official Results Book – Ice Hockey

2018 Winter Paralympics events
Paralympics, Winter
 
2018
2018